Startin' Fires is the fifth studio album by American country music singer Blake Shelton. The album was released on November 18, 2008 via Warner Bros. Nashville. Its lead-off single, "She Wouldn't Be Gone", became Shelton's fifth number one hit on the Billboard Hot Country Songs chart for the week of February 7, 2009. "I'll Just Hold On" was released as the album's second single. For Starting Fires, Shelton co-wrote two tracks.

Content
In an interview with CMT, Shelton explained the album title saying, "it just seemed like the right statement for what we're trying to do with my career right now. And I never felt confident enough to make a statement like that on an album title - not until now. I feel like I'm coming with the most momentum that I've ever had on a record."

The first single, "She Wouldn't Be Gone", debuted at number 52 on the Billboard Hot Country Songs chart for the week of August 23, 2008. It reached a peak of Number One on the chart week of February 7, 2009. "I'll Just Hold On" was released in February 2009 as the second single, which debuted at number 60 and peaked at number 8.

One of the album's songs, "I Don't Care", was first featured on Shelton's previous album, Pure BS. According to About.com, Shelton explained that he wanted the song to be "given its due", since it had not been released as a single. The song was not re-recorded for Startin' Fires.

Scott Hendricks produced all but two tracks on the album. "This Is Gonna Take All Night" was produced by Brent Rowan, and "I Don't Care" was produced by Bobby Braddock. Shelton co-wrote the track "Bare Skin Rug" with his future wife, Miranda Lambert, who also sings duet vocals on it.

Track listing

Personnel

 David Angell – violin
 Monisa Angell – viola
 Bobby Braddock – string arrangements, strings
 Tom Bukovac – electric guitar, sitar
 Lisa Cochran – background vocals 
 Perry Coleman – background vocals 
 Melodie Crittenden – background vocals
 Eric Darken – percussion, shaker
 David Davidson – violin
 Chip Davis – background vocals
 Shannon Forrest – drums, percussion
 Paul Franklin – steel guitar
 Aubrey Haynie – fiddle, mandolin
 Wes Hightower – background vocals 
 Mike Johnson – pedal steel guitar
 Miranda Lambert – vocals on "Bare Skin Rug"
 Tim Lauer – Hammond B-3 organ, string arrangements, strings 
 B. James Lowry – acoustic guitar
 Chris McHugh – drums, percussion 
 Anthony LaMarchina – cello
 Brent Mason – acoustic guitar, electric guitar
 Greg Morrow – drums, percussion 
 Gordon Mote – Hammond B-3 organ, piano
 Brent Rowan – acoustic guitar, electric guitar
 Blake Shelton – acoustic guitar, lead vocals
 Jimmie Lee Sloas – bass guitar
 Bryan Sutton – acoustic guitar
 Russell Terrell – background vocals 
 Ilya Toshinsky – acoustic guitar
 Kristin Wilkinson – viola
 Glenn Worf – bass guitar
 Craig Young – bass guitar
 Jonathan Yudkin – mandolin

Chart performance

Weekly charts

Year-end charts

Singles

Release history

References

2008 albums
Blake Shelton albums
Warner Records albums
Albums produced by Scott Hendricks